The Stand is a post-apocalyptic dark fantasy novel written by American author Stephen King and first published in 1978 by Doubleday. The plot centers on a deadly pandemic of weaponized influenza and its aftermath, in which the few surviving humans gather into factions that are each led by a personification of either good or evil and seem fated to clash with each other. King started writing the story in February 1975, seeking to create an epic in the spirit of The Lord of the Rings. The book was difficult for him to write because of the large number of characters and storylines.

In 1990, The Stand was reprinted as a Complete and Uncut Edition. King restored over 400 pages from texts that were initially reduced from his original manuscript, revised the order of the chapters, shifted the novel's setting from 1980 to 10 years forward, and accordingly corrected a number of cultural references. The Complete and Uncut Edition of The Stand is Stephen King's longest stand-alone work at 1,152 pages, surpassing his 1,138-page novel It. The book has sold 4.5 million copies.

The Stand was highly appreciated by reviewers and is considered one of King's best novels. It has been included in lists of the best books of all time by Rolling Stone, Time, the Modern Library, Amazon and the BBC. An eponymous miniseries based on the novel was broadcast on ABC in 1994. From 2008 to 2012, Marvel Comics published a series of comics written by Roberto Aguirre-Sacasa and illustrated by Mike Perkins. Another miniseries debuted on CBS All Access in December 2020, and finished airing in February 2021.

Plot
An extremely contagious and lethal strain of influenza is developed as a biological weapon in a secret U.S. Department of Defense laboratory in northern California. It is estimated to be 99.4% fatal. The Complete and Uncut Edition includes a prologue detailing the development of the virus and the security breach that causes its accidental release. Security guard Charles Campion manages to escape before the facility is locked down and takes his family out of the state.

After a couple of days, his car crashes at a gas station in Arnette, Texas. Bystanders and ambulance workers become infected by the dying Campion and his dead wife and child. The United States Army attempts to isolate Arnette, going so far as to execute civilians attempting to flee, but in vain; the virus, christened the "superflu" or "Captain Trips", spreads across the country. The government then has its agents (unknowingly) release the virus in the USSR, its satellite states and China to guarantee their destruction as well. 

When martial law fails to contain the virus, a global pandemic of apocalyptic proportions kills nearly the entire world population within a month. The military collapses due to mass desertions and mutinies, and society soon follows with the near-extinction of humanity. Some of the few who are immune also die, unable either to accept the loss of their loved ones or to survive in a world where they must fend for themselves.

Stuart "Stu" Redman, one of the Arnette residents who encountered Campion, proves immune to the virus. The CDC holds him forcibly in a research center in Stovington, Vermont, in the hope that a treatment can be found. Stu escapes after the staff become infected, killing one man in self-defense. He meets sociology professor Glen Bateman and his dog Kojak, pregnant college student Frances "Frannie" Goldsmith, and overweight teenage nerd Harold Lauder. Stuart and Frannie are drawn to each other and eventually fall in love, then enter a marital relationship. This enrages Harold, who grew up with Frannie and has an unhealthy obsession with her; he then schemes to harm the couple out of romantic jealousy.

Most of the survivors experience essentially the same two dreams. In one, a friendly 108-year-old black woman living in Hemingford Home, Nebraska, "Mother Abagail" Freemantle, invites them to her farm. They also dream of a terrifying "dark man" who calls himself Randall Flagg, among other things. People seek out one or the other. Stu and his group eventually meet Mother Abagail, who is convinced God has chosen her to do His will. 

The group travels to Boulder, Colorado, along with other survivors. These include Larry Underwood, a disillusioned pop singer; Nick Andros, a deaf-mute drifter; Tom Cullen, a kind-hearted, mentally disabled man; Nadine Cross, a teacher in her 30s who is still a virgin; and Ralph Brentner, a good-natured farmer. As survivors continue to trickle in, the group starts organizing the hundreds of residents. They establish their community as the "Boulder Free Zone", a democratic city-state modeled after the United States' former ideals.

Meanwhile, Randall Flagg, who possesses supernatural abilities, creates his own  totalitarian society in Las Vegas with psychopaths as his lieutenants. His people worship (and fear) him as a messiah and submit to his iron-fisted dictatorship. He has drug addicts and others who incur his displeasure crucified. Flagg rescues Lloyd Henreid, a mass murderer, from his prison cell and makes him his right-hand man. 

A pyromaniac nicknamed "The Trashcan Man" blows up oil tanks in Gary, Indiana, and travels to Las Vegas with a homicidal madman named "The Kid". After Flagg sends a pack of wolves to kill The Kid because he intended to kill Flagg and take over, The Trashcan Man makes his way to Las Vegas, from which he is sent to find stockpiles of weapons for Flagg, as Flagg prepares for war with the Free Zone. However, Flagg's people soon grow weary of his dictatorship, and many secretly try to leave.

Mother Abagail, believing that she has sinned by being proud, goes into the wilderness on a spiritual journey without consulting anyone. In her absence, the Free Zone's leadership committee decides to secretly send three people to spy on Flagg, but Flagg already knows who two of them are. One, Judge Farris, dies in a shootout with Flagg's men, and the other, Dayna Jurgens, is captured, but manages to kill herself to avoid revealing who the third spy (Tom Cullen) is.

Harold and Nadine secretly give their allegiance to Flagg, who in fact wants Nadine to be his wife and the mother of his child. Harold plants a bomb in the house where the committee is to meet. The explosion kills seven or eight people, including Nick Andros and Susan Stern, but the other committee members are saved by the commotion caused by Mother Abagail's unexpected return and Frannie's too-late warning. Before dying, the extremely emaciated Mother Abagail reports God's will: Stu, Glen, Larry, and Ralph (all of the surviving committee members except for the pregnant Frannie) must go to Las Vegas on foot to confront Flagg. She also states that only three of them will get there.

Harold and Nadine also set out for Las Vegas, but Harold suffers a broken leg in a motorcycle accident (caused by Flagg to eliminate Harold) on the way, and Nadine leaves him to die. After enduring several days and nights of his broken leg slowly becoming infected and gangrenous, Harold regrets his malicious behavior, accepts that he will soon die and commits suicide by shooting himself in the head. Nadine, going on alone, finds Flagg in the desert near Las Vegas and he impregnates her; the horrifying experience (his face changes into that of a demon) causes her to lose her mind. Flagg brings her back to Las Vegas as his bride, but she manages to goad him into killing her and their unborn child.

Stu breaks his leg en route to Las Vegas and persuades the others to go on without him. The remaining three are quickly taken prisoner. Glen refuses to grovel before Flagg, and when he taunts Flagg, Lloyd kills him under Flagg's orders. Flagg gathers his people to witness Larry and Ralph's executions. Moments before they are about to be torn apart via dismemberment, the Trashcan Man drags in a nuclear warhead (an atonement attempt for blowing up Flagg's entire experienced pilot crew), and the "Hand of God" detonates the bomb, destroying Las Vegas, as well as Larry and Ralph.

The inhabitants of Boulder anxiously await the birth of Frannie's baby. They fear that the child will succumb to the superflu. Soon after her son is born, Stu returns, having been rescued by Tom. The baby contracts the superflu, but manages to recover. Once Frannie is again pregnant, she and Stu decide to leave Boulder and move back to Frannie's hometown of Ogunquit, Maine, therefore founding an eastern settlement, and raise their children in peace.

The Complete and Uncut Edition includes an epilogue in which Flagg wakes up with memory loss on a beach. From the jungle emerge a dozen dark-skinned men with spears who eventually bow down and worship him.

Characters

Background 
In Danse Macabre, King writes about the origins of The Stand at some length. One source was Patty Hearst's case. The original idea was to create a novel about the episode because "it seemed that only a novel might really succeed in explaining all the contradictions".

The author also mentions George R. Stewart's novel Earth Abides, which describes the odyssey of one of the last human survivors after the population is nearly annihilated by a plague, as one of the main inspirations:

With my Patty Hearst book, I never found the right way in... and during that entire six-week period, something else was nagging very quietly at the back of my mind. It was a news story I had read about an accidental  spill in Utah. (...) This article called up memories of a novel called Earth Abides, by George R. Stewart.

(...) and one day while sitting at my typewriter, (...) I wrote—just to write something: The world comes to an end but everybody in the SLA is somehow immune. Snake bit them. I looked at that for a while and then typed: No more gas shortages. That was sort of cheerful, in a horrible sort of way.

The Stand was also planned by King as an epic The Lord of the Rings–type story in a contemporary American setting:

For a long time—ten years, at least—I had wanted to write a fantasy epic like The Lord of the Rings, only with an American setting. I just couldn't figure out how to do it. Then . . . after my wife and kids and I moved to Boulder, Colorado, I saw a 60 Minutes segment on CBW (chemical-biological warfare). I never forgot the gruesome footage of the test mice shuddering, convulsing, and dying, all in twenty seconds or less. That got me remembering a chemical spill in Utah, that killed a bunch of sheep (these were canisters on their way to some burial ground; they fell off the truck and ruptured). I remembered a news reporter saying, 'If the winds had been blowing the other way, there was Salt Lake City.' This incident later served as the basis of a movie called Rage, starring George C. Scott, but before it was released, I was deep into The Stand, finally writing my American fantasy epic, set in a plague-decimated USA. Only instead of a hobbit, my hero was a Texan named Stu Redman, and instead of a Dark Lord, my villain was a ruthless drifter and supernatural madman named Randall Flagg. The land of Mordor ('where the shadows lie,' according to Tolkien) was played by Las Vegas.

While writing The Stand, King nearly stopped because of writer's block. Eventually, he reached the conclusion that the heroes were becoming too complacent, and were beginning to repeat all the same mistakes of their old society. In an attempt to resolve this, he added the part of the storyline where Harold and Nadine construct a bomb, which explodes in a Free Zone committee meeting, killing Nick Andros, Chad Norris, and Susan Stern. Later, Mother Abagail explains on her deathbed that God permitted the bombing because He was dissatisfied with the heroes' focus on petty politics, and not on the ultimate quest of destroying Flagg. When telling this story, King sardonically observed that the bomb saved the book, and that he only had to kill half of the core cast to do this.

According to King, Blue Öyster Cult's 1976 song "(Don't Fear) The Reaper" has also served as one source of inspiration for the novel.

Publication history 

The novel was originally published in 1978 in hardcover, with a setting date of 1980, in abridged form. The first paperback release in 1980 changed the setting date to 1985. The novel marks the first appearance of Randall Flagg, King's recurring antagonist, whom King would bring back several times in his later writings.

In 1990, an unabridged edition of The Stand was published, billed as The Complete and Uncut Edition. Published in hardcover by Doubleday in May 1990, this became the longest book published by King at 1,152 pages. When the novel was originally published in 1978, Doubleday warned King that the book's size would make it too expensive for the market to bear. 

As a result, he cut about 400 pages (around 150,000 words) from the original manuscript. This edition reinstates most of the deletions (as selected by King) and updates the setting from the 1980s to the 1990s. This new edition features a new preface by King and illustrations by Bernie Wrightson. Doubleday published a deluxe edition of The Stand: The Complete and Uncut Edition, limited to 1,250 numbered copies and 52 lettered copies. This edition, known as the "Coffin Box" edition due to the book being housed in a wooden case, was signed by King and Wrightson.

Reception 
The Stand received critical acclaim; it was nominated for the World Fantasy Award for Best Novel in 1979, and was adapted into both a television miniseries for ABC and a graphic novel published by Marvel Comics. In 2003, the novel was listed at number 53 on the BBC's The Big Read poll.

In the decades after its publication, The Stand was criticized for including the Magical Negro stereotype within its plot, with Mother Abagail being identified as a character whose sole purpose was to help the white protagonists.

Adaptations

Television 

A film adaptation of The Stand was in development hell for over 10 years. During the 1980s, Stephen King had planned a theatrical film, with George A. Romero directing and himself writing, not trusting anybody else with the project. In the 1995 Complete and Uncut edition of the book, King admitted he had in mind a few fan castings for his characters, those being Robert Duvall as Randall Flagg, and Marshall Crenshaw as Larry Underwood. However, writing a workable screenplay proved difficult, due to the novel's length. King talked about adapting it for television, but was informed that the television networks did not "want to see the end of the world, particularly in prime time." Eventually King allowed screenwriter Rospo Pallenberg, who was a fan of The Stand, to write his own adaptation of the novel. Pallenberg's script would clock the film in at close to three hours, while still staying true to the novel. Everyone liked the script; however, just as it was about to finally come together, Warner Bros. backed out of the project.

ABC eventually offered Stephen King the chance to make The Stand into an eight-hour miniseries. King wrote a new screenplay (toned down slightly for television). The miniseries was broadcast in 1994, directed by Mick Garris, and starred such actors as Gary Sinise, Adam Storke, Molly Ringwald, Corin Nemec, Rob Lowe, Miguel Ferrer, Laura San Giacomo, Jamey Sheridan, Ossie Davis, Ruby Dee, Bill Fagerbakke, and Shawnee Smith, with notable cameos including John Landis, Ed Harris, Kathy Bates, Sam Raimi, and King himself. Parts of the miniseries were shot in Las Vegas, Nevada as well as  Salt Lake City, Utah State Prison, Sundance, Orem, Provo Canyon, and Salina in Utah.

Between 2011 and 2016, Warner Bros. Pictures and CBS Films were developing a feature-length film adaptation of The Stand. In August 2011, director David Yates and screenwriter Steve Kloves, known for their collaboration on the Harry Potter films, were hired to direct/write a multimovie version of The Stand, but left the project in October 2011, as Yates felt it would work better as a miniseries. Both Ben Affleck and Scott Cooper dropped out over creative differences with the studio. On February 25, 2014, Josh Boone was hired to write and direct the adaptation. He later revealed that he wanted Christian Bale to play Randall Flagg and Matthew McConaughey for the role of Stu Redman. 

By September 10, 2014, the script had been completed and pre-production was underway. In November, Boone planned to split his adaptation into four full-length feature films in an effort to remain true to the breadth of King's sprawling novel. In June 2015, Warner Bros. proposed an eight-part Showtime miniseries to set up the story, which would culminate in Josh Boone's film. However, in February 2016, The Stand project was put on hold and the rights reverted to CBS Films.

In September 2017, King talked of doing an extended TV series on Showtime or CBS All Access. In January 2019, a 10-hour limited series was ordered by CBS Television Studios to be broadcast on CBS All Access. Alexander Skarsgard, James Marsden, Amber Heard, Whoopi Goldberg, Greg Kinnear, Odessa Young, and Henry Zaga were all in consideration for the roles of Randall Flagg, Stu Redman, Nadine Cross, Mother Abagail, Glen Bateman, Frannie Goldsmith, and Nick Andros, respectively. The production was filmed in and near Vancouver, British Columbia, Canada, from September 2019 to March 2020; filming was completed a few days before it would have been shut down due to the COVID-19 pandemic. The production features Stephen King's son Owen King as a producer and writer, and a new ending written by Stephen King.

Comics

Marvel Comics adapted The Stand into a series of six five-issue comic book miniseries. The series was written by Roberto Aguirre-Sacasa and illustrated by Mike Perkins. Colorist Laura Martin, letterer Chris Eliopoulos, and cover artist Lee Bermejo were also on the staff. The first issue of The Stand: Captain Trips was released on September 10, 2008.

Music
Metallica derived the title for their album "Ride the Lightning" from a quote from The Stand.

The Alarm had a song on the 1984 album Declaration entitled "The Stand (Prophecy)" as an homage to the book. The song contained certain lyrics directly related to the book, such as "I met the walking dude, religious, with his worn out cowboy boots", and "Hey Trashcan, where you going boy?" The main chorus of the song was "Come on down and meet your maker, come on down and make the stand."

The title track to the 1987 album Among the Living by the band Anthrax is based on the novel.

References

External links
 
 Bookpoi  – How to identify first edition copies of The Stand by Stephen King.

 
1978 American novels
American post-apocalyptic novels
American fantasy novels
Novels about dreams
Novels about human pregnancy
Novels about nightmares
Novels about religion
Novels by Stephen King
Novels set in the 1980s
Novels set in the 1990s
Novels set in Arkansas
Novels set in Atlanta
Novels set in Boulder, Colorado
Novels set in Indiana
Novels set in the Las Vegas Valley
Novels set in Maine
Novels set in Nebraska
Novels set in New York City
Novels set in New Hampshire
Novels set in Oklahoma
Novels set in Texas
Novels set in Vermont
Novels about influenza outbreaks
Doubleday (publisher) books
American novels adapted into television shows
Demon novels
Novels adapted into comics